Jan Leonardus Louw (born 19 June 1959), known as Lennie Louw, is a South African-born Namibian cricketer.

Louw made his One Day International debut for Namibia in the World Cup in 2003 at the age of 43, having spent the previous 27 years playing first-class cricket in South Africa. He also played in the ICC Trophy between 1994 and 2001. At the 2001 ICC Trophy, he also coached Namibia.

In February 2020, he was named in Namibia's squad for the Over-50s Cricket World Cup in South Africa. However, the tournament was cancelled during the third round of matches due to the coronavirus pandemic.

References

External links

1959 births
Living people
White South African people
Namibian Afrikaner people
Namibian cricket captains
Namibia One Day International cricketers
Griqualand West cricketers
Namibian people of South African descent
People from Dikgatlong Local Municipality
Coaches of the Namibia national cricket team
Namibian cricket coaches
Namibian cricketers